In German-speaking jurisdictions, Landesbank (plural ), generally refers to a bank operating within a territorial subdivision that has autonomy but not full sovereignty. It is occasionally translated as "provincial bank".

Austria-Hungary

In the Austro-Hungarian Empire under the rule of the Habsburg monarchy,  were government-sponsored banks established in some of the kingdoms and lands of the crown: 
 Landesbank des Königreichs Galizien und Lodomerien mit dem Grossherzogtum Krakau, est. 1883 in Lemberg (now Lviv) for the Kingdom of Galicia and Lodomeria and the Grand Duchy of Kraków
 Landesbank des Königreiches Böhmen, est. 1890 in Prague for the Kingdom of Bohemia
 Landesbank für Bosnien und Herzegowina, est. 1895 in Sarajevo for Bosnia and Herzegovina under Austro-Hungarian rule
 Bukowinaer Landesbank, est. 1905 in Czernowitz (now Chernivtsi) for the Duchy of Bukovina
 Kroatische Landesbank, est. 1909 in Esseg (now Osijek) for the Kingdom of Croatia-Slavonia
 Krainische Landesbank, est. 1912 in Laibach (now Ljubljana) for the Duchy of Carniola

The name Landesbank also survives in regional entities of the Raiffeisen Group in Austria and, similarly, the Raiffeisen Landesbank Südtirol – Cassa Centrale Raiffeisen dell'Alto Adige in the Italian region of South Tyrol.

Germany

Evolution over time

The current  are the product of numerous episodes of development and consolidation starting in the 18th century, tracking the formation of Germany itself. With the delineation of West Germany's  between 1948 and 1957, the Landesbanks started acting as "house banks" of their respective , thus expanding into some of largest foreign issuers in Germany.

Northern Germany

 1765:  established in Braunschweig
 1840:  established in Hanover
 1883:  established in Oldenburg
 1906:  renamed , shortened in 1922 to 
 1917:  (LB Kiel) established in Kiel
  established in Hanover
 1918:  established in Hanover
 1919:  renamed  
 1928:  established in Bremen
 1938:  and  merge to form the  
  established in Bremen
  (HLB) established in Hamburg
 1983:  and  merged to form  (also known as Bremer Landesbank, or BLB)
 2003:  and  merged to form HSH Nordbank AG, with joint head offices in Hamburg and Kiel;  spun out
 2017: BLB merged into NORD/LB 
 2019: HSH Nordbank privatized and renamed Hamburg Commercial Bank; Landesbank role in Hamburg and Schleswig-Holstein taken up by NORD/LB

Western and central Germany

 1819:  established in Altenburg, later renamed 
 1832:  established in Münster, sometimes referred to as the first Landesbank
  established in Kassel
 1840:  established in Wiesbaden
 1847:  established in Merseburg
 1854:  established in Cologne; relocated in 1877 to Düsseldorf, and renamed in 1888 Landesbank der Rheinprovinz
 1890:  renamed 
 1931:  in distress, suspends payments despite emergency liquidity assistance from Deutsche Girozentrale,  and the Reichsbank;  clearing house role transferred to the Cologne branch of the 
 1935:  renamed 
 1940:  established in Darmstadt
 1941: Landesbank Saar (later known as SaarLB) established in Saarbrücken
 1943:  formed from the 's takeover of 
 1953:  Kassel,  and  merged to form  (Helaba)
 1969:  and  merged to form Westdeutsche Landesbank Girozentrale (WestLB) established with joint head offices in Düsseldorf and Münster, North Rhine-Westphalia, and branches in Cologne, Dortmund, Bielefeld, and Essen
 1972: WestLB starts developing a foreign branch network by opening in Luxembourg, followed by London in 1973 and New York in 1975. 
 1993:  spun off from Landesbank Rheinland-Pfalz
 2002: WestLB spins off a public development bank, NRW.Bank, converts itself into a joint-stock company as WestLB AG, and sells its private banking business to Merck Finck Privatbankiers
 2012: WestLB dismantled with assets transferred to Portigon Financial Services; Landesbank role in North Rhine-Westphalia taken up by Helaba

Baden-Württemberg

 1818:  established in Stuttgart as national savings bank of the Kingdom of Württemberg
 1870:  established in Mannheim as the note-issuing bank of the Grand Duchy of Baden
 1871:  established in Stuttgart as the note-issuing bank of the Kingdom of Württemberg
 1916:  established in Stuttgart, later renamed 
 1924:  established in Stuttgart; renamed  in 1932
 1929:  established in Mannheim
 1932:  relocated from Mannheim to Karlsruhe
 1934:  and  deprived of their note-issuing role and repurposed as commercial entities; the latter renamed  in 1935
  and  merged into entity based in Karlsruhe and named  in 1935
 1972:  and  merged into 
 1975:  and  merged to form  in Stuttgart, renamed  in 1977
 1978: ,  and  merged to form  (BW-Bank) in Stuttgart
 1988:  and  merged to form  (SüdwestLB) in Stuttgart
 2005: BW-Bank merged into LBBW

Bavaria

 1884:  established in Munich
 1914:  founded, permanently established in 1917 in Nuremberg and relocated in 1920 in Munich
 1925:  reorganized and renamed 
 1949:  renamed 
 1972:  and  merged to form Bayerische Landesbank Girozentrale (BayernLB)

Eastern Germany

 1819:  established in Altenburg
 1849:  established in Meiningen
 1915:  established in Magdeburg
 1922:  established in Weimar
 1923:  takes over the Landesbank in Rudolstadt and the 
 1924:  established, renamed  in 1937 
 1928:  and  merged to form , with head office in Magdeburg
 1945:  closed by the Soviet Military Administration in Germany
 1946:  absorbed by 
 1992:  established in Leipzig, Saxony
 1993:  integrated into Landesbank Berlin as Investitionsbank Berlin 
 2004: Investitionsbank Berlin spun off from Landesbank Berlin

Cross-regional consolidation

 1992:  takes up Landesbank role in Thuringia, and is renamed  while keeping the shorthand name Helaba
 NORD/LB takes up Landesbank role in Saxony-Anhalt
 1993: NORD/LB takes up Landesbank role in Mecklenburg-Vorpommern
 2001: BayernLB acquires majority control of SaarLB
 2005: LRP merged into LBBW
 2008: SachsenLB merged into LBBW 
 2010-2013: Saarland acquires control of SaarLB from BayernLB

Current German 

The current  are part of the Sparkassen-Finanzgruppe, one of the three pillars of Germany's banking system. Their business is predominantly wholesale banking, partly to serve local savings banks. With a few exceptions, Landesbanken and Sparkassen are chartered by national and state banking laws to pursue a public purpose. As of late 2022, they are: 

 Landesbank Baden-Württemberg (LBBW) in Stuttgart, covering Baden-Württemberg, Rhineland-Palatinate, and Saxony
 Bayerische Landesbank (BayernLB) in Munich, covering Bavaria
 Landesbank Hessen-Thüringen (Helaba) in Frankfurt and Erfurt, covering Brandenburg, Hesse, North Rhine-Westphalia, and Thuringia
 Norddeutsche Landesbank (NORD/LB) in Hanover, covering Bremen, Hamburg, Lower Saxony, Mecklenburg-Vorpommern, Saxony-Anhalt, and Schleswig-Holstein
 Landesbank Saar (SaarLB) in Saarbrücken, covering Saarland

Four other German institutions are named  without playing the role of the above five within the public sector: 
 Landesbank Berlin (LBB) was converted into a joint-stock company in 2007, when the DSGV rescued it and took full ownership of its share capital; it is part of the Sparkassen-Finanzgruppe
 Oldenburgische Landesbank (OLB, est. 1869) has always been a private-sector bank, controlled since 2017 by Apollo Global Management.

Liechtenstein

See also

 Cantonal banks, the Swiss equivalent of 
 Bank of North Dakota
 Puerto Rico Government Development Bank

References

External links 
http://www.faz.net (Bilanzsummen minus 1.809.100.000.000 Euro) (Stand September 2010) (Schuldenbremse Grundgesetz)

 
Government-owned banks